Campaign Against Antisemitism (CAA) is a British non-governmental organisation established in August 2014 by members of the Anglo-Jewish community. It publishes research, organises rallies and petitions, and conducts litigation.

History
CAA was set up in early August 2014, after an increase in antisemitic incidents that accompanied the 2014 Israel–Gaza conflict. A grassroots campaign, it grew largely out of social media activity among those who felt more should be done to promote the Jewish community's concerns after a meeting to discuss responses where a campaigner had her concerns dismissed by Board of Deputies president Vivian Wineman.

In January 2015, the then-UK Home Secretary, Theresa May, praised CAA for its work and undertook to ensure that the law against antisemitism is "robustly enforced". On 1 October 2015, it was registered as a charitable incorporated organisation (CIO) on 1 October 2015. Its chair is Gideon Falter and its first director of communications was Jonathan Sacerdoti.

Publications
CAA publishes primary and secondary research based on opinion polling and Freedom of Information Act 2000 requests. CAA's National Antisemitic Crime Audit collects and analyses antisemitic crime data from all police forces in the United Kingdom. CAA uses the report to assess trends in antisemitic crime and to make recommendations to the British government.

Rallies and petitions
CAA's first demonstration was against the Tricycle Theatre in London, which had refused to participate in that November's UK Jewish Film Festival due to the contemporaneous conflict in Gaza, unless the festival rejected funding from parties involved, notably a £1,400 sponsorship from the Israeli embassy, which the Tricycle Theatre offered to replace. In August 2014, following discussions with the festival organizers, the Tricycle withdrew its condition.

In August 2018, CAA organised a demonstration outside Labour Party's headquarters to protest against the handling of antisemitism in the Labour Party, and to condemn the-then party leader, Jeremy Corbyn. That same month, the organisation launched a Change.org petition titled "Jeremy Corbyn is an antisemite and must go"; it featured a Labour slogan modified to read "For the many not the Jew", which was signed by over 30,000 by 30 August 2018. A counter-petition against CAA with the title "To Get the Charity Commission to Deregister the Zionist Campaign Against Anti-Semitism" was signed by almost 7,500 and sent to the Charity Commission for England and Wales, which said in response that it was "assessing concerns raised about the Campaign Against Antisemitism's campaigning activities". In October 2018, the Charity Commission said that charities must be independent of party politics and insisted that CAA reword its petition.

In November 2018, CAA asked the Equality and Human Rights Commission (EHRC) to investigate the Labour Party. In May 2019, following complaints submitted by CAA and the Jewish Labour Movement, the EHRC launched a formal investigation into whether Labour had "unlawfully discriminated against, harassed or victimised people because they are Jewish".

Litigation
CAA has used the process of judicial review in English law to scrutinise and reverse decisions made by the government and authorities. In March 2017, CAA forced the Crown Prosecution Service (CPS) to quash a decision not to prosecute an alleged far-right leader over a speech in which he issued a call to "free England from Jewish control".

In December 2017, the CPS decided not to prosecute an Islamic Human Rights Commission director who was one of the organisers of a Quds Day rally; during the rally, the director allegedly stated that Zionists were responsible for the Grenfell Tower fire, called for Israel's destruction, and said that he was fed up with Zionists, their rabbis, synagogues, and supporters. CAA attempted to begin a private prosecution for inciting racial or religious hatred, which was blocked by the CPS, as they had determined there was no "realistic prospect of conviction".

In early 2018, CAA brought a successful private prosecution against Alison Chabloz, a Holocaust denier who released three YouTube videos of self-written antisemitic songs characterising Auschwitz as a "theme park" and the Holocaust as the "Holohoax". Chabloz was subsequently imprisoned for breaking the conditions of her suspended sentence. In July 2018, Gilad Atzmon was forced to apologise to CAA chairman Gideon Falter and pay costs and damages after being sued for libel. Atzmon acknowledged that he had falsely stated that Falter had personally profited from fabricating antisemitic incidents.

In 2019, the CAA was sued by Tony Greenstein for libel in relation to what is or is not antisemitism following five articles it had published about him. In 2017, Greenstein had launched a petition asking the Charity Commission to deregister the organisation, claiming its purpose was to limit freedom of speech by calling opponents of Israel antisemitic. Greenstein's libel claim was dismissed.

Opposition to events
A February 2017 letter to The Guardian, which was signed by 250 academics, stated that CAA cites the Working Definition of Antisemitism in asking its supporters to "record, film, photograph and get witness evidence" about Israeli Apartheid Week events, and CAA "will help you to take it up with the university, students' union or even the police." The signatories said: "These are outrageous interferences with free expression, and are direct attacks on academic freedom ... . It is with disbelief that we witness explicit political interference in university affairs in the interests of Israel under the thin disguise of concern about antisemitism."

In August 2019, CAA asked Goldsmiths, University of London, to cancel a booking made by the Communist Party of Great Britain because they objected to some of the speakers who they said "have a history of baiting Jews or outright antisemitism". The university in response referenced their commitment to free speech and that hiring event space to legal organisations was a common practice amongst universities.

Criticism
In January 2015, the All-Party Parliamentary Group against Antisemitism wrote: "We were somewhat disappointed to note that not all of the messages from that group [CAA] have been in line with CST's stated approach of seeking to avoid undue panic and alarm." They added "it is important that the leadership do not conflate concerns about activity legitimately protesting Israel's actions with antisemitism, as we have seen has been the case on some occasions." That same month, the Institute for Jewish Policy Research said that a CAA survey about antisemitism was "littered with flaws", and "may even be rather irresponsible". After criticism by CAA of Shami Chakrabarti over her 2016 report into antisemitism in the UK Labour Party, a number of British Jews wrote to The Guardian dissociating themselves from what they described as "the pro-Israel lobbyists of the Campaign Against Antisemitism".

In July 2018, the Labour MP Margaret Hodge became one of a number of honorary patrons of CAA. In the run up to the 2019 United Kingdom general election, CAA asked her to resign as a patron because she was standing as a Labour Party candidate; she did so but described their request as "both astonishing and wounding", showing a lack of respect and impugning her integrity. In February 2020, the Morning Star reported that Shahrar Ali, the Home Affairs spokesman of the Green Party of England and Wales, had made a formal complaint to the Charity Commission that the CAA had failed to be independent of party politics, which is a legal requirement for charities, and that the commission was assessing. CAA had previously described a 2009 speech by Ali, who described Tony Blair, George W. Bush, and Ehud Olmert, as "warmongers", as antisemitic and an "offensive rant".

References

Further reading

External links
 

2014 establishments in the United Kingdom
Jewish charities based in the United Kingdom
Opposition to antisemitism in the United Kingdom
Organizations established in 2014